Purse State Park is a former Maryland state park located on the Potomac River in Charles County that has been subsumed into the  Nanjemoy Wildlife Management Area. As the Purse Area, the former park is known for fossil hunting on the beaches of Wades Bay at the southern end of the Nanjemoy WMA. Fossil discoveries have included shark teeth and Cibicides.

References

External links
Nanjemoy Wildlife Management Area Maryland Department of Natural Resources
Nanjemoy Wildlife Management Area Map Maryland Department of Natural Resources

Parks in Charles County, Maryland
State parks of Maryland